John Jegon (1550 – 13 March 1618) was an English academic and Bishop of Norwich. He supported uniformity of Anglican doctrine and worship, and strong government. This led him into conflict with John Robinson, later pastor to the Mayflower emigrants. On the other hand, he made efforts to satisfy local Puritans by the appointment of preachers in his diocese. Nicholas Bownd dedicated to him a work on doctrine of Sabbath.

Education and academic career
He was educated at Queens' College, Cambridge, where he graduated B.A. and became a Fellow in 1572, and was then at Corpus Christi College, Cambridge, where he became Master in 1590. His pupils included both Roger Manners and Francis Manners, Earls of Rutland. He had a long correspondence with their mother Elizabeth, widow of John Manners, 4th Earl of Rutland.

He was Vice-Chancellor of the University of Cambridge, from 1596 to 1598. As Vice-Chancellor he attempted to discipline John Rudd.

Clerical career
He became Dean of Norwich in 1601, with the recommendation of John Whitgift. Two years later he was appointed as Bishop there. He resided in Aylsham.

Family
He married Dorothy, daughter of Richard Vaughan. On his death she married the diplomat Sir Charles Cornwallis.

Notes

1550 births
1618 deaths
Bishops of Norwich
Alumni of Queens' College, Cambridge
Fellows of Queens' College, Cambridge
Deans of Norwich
Vice-Chancellors of the University of Cambridge
Masters of Corpus Christi College, Cambridge
17th-century Church of England bishops